Shib Tang (also Romanized as Shīb Tang and Shīb-e Tang) is a village in Jereh Rural District, Jereh and Baladeh District, Kazerun County, Fars Province, Iran. At the 2006 census, its population was 185, in 34 families.

References 

Populated places in Kazerun County